The UK Film Festival, founded in 2011, is a film festival held annually in Soho, London, in November. The festival aims to discover new filmmakers but always mixes established filmmakers into their screening programmes.

History
The UK Film Festival was started in 2011 by Mahdi H. Nejad and Murray Woodfield.

Previous festival screenings have included films that have gone on to win  Oscars including "Ida," "The Broken Circle Breakdown," "Stutterer" and "The Phone Call". BAFTA winners include "Operator". They also hosted the film festival world premiere of Roald Dahl's "Esio Trot" with Dustin Hoffman, Judi Dench and James Corden. They present awards for shorts, features, documentaries, animations, student shorts and music videos as well as special awards for excellence.

In addition to the festival, the organisers run a yearly short script competition.  2012 year's winner - "Mike" went on to be co-produced by the UK Film Festival, and won the Crystal Bear for best short film in the Berlin Film Festival (Berlinale 2014), the first British film to win this award. The following year their script winner, "A Confession" was made into a film that among other international awards also won the Crystal Bear at Berlin Film Festival (Berlinale 2015). Both films were directed by Petros Silvestros and achieved worldwide distribution through interfilm.
The festival director is Murray Woodfield.

Awards
Awards categories include:
 Best Feature Film
 Best Actor
 Best Short Film
 Best British Short Film
 Special Jury Prize for Short Film
 Best Feature Documentary
 Best Student Film
 Best Music Video
 Best Short Documentary
 Best Animation
 Best First Film

See also
 BFI London Film Festival
 British Animation Film Festival
 London Independent Film Festival
 London International Animation Festival
 London International Student Film Festival
 London Short Film Festival

References

External links

Film festivals in London